Muhammad Arfiza Shahab or better known as Umay Shahab (born February 16, 2001) is an Indonesian actor, singer, presenter and model. Shahab began to be known when he starred in the Wulan (soap opera) and acted as Pandu, Wulan's son. However, his name began to be widely known thanks to his role as Bobby in the soap opera Eneng dan Kaos Kaki Ajaib (Eneng and Magic Socks). In addition, as a singer, Shahab released his first album sponsored by KFC titled Umay. The album achieved success with triple platinum awards from its CD sales of 250 thousand copies. Through this album, Shahab also won the AMI Award for Best Children Male Solo Artist and AMI Award for Best Children Album at 14th Annual Anugerah Musik Indonesia. In 2009, he began playing movie with the personnel of Indonesian rock and roll band, The Changcuters entitled The Tarix Jabrix 2.

Biography

Early life
Umay Shahab was born in Haji Hospital Jakarta, Makasar, East Jakarta. He comes from Ba 'Alawi sada family of the Arab Hadhrami surnamed Aal Shihāb-Uddīn, his father was a private worker named Said Hanafi Shahab, while his mother is a Betawi woman named Yahni Dahmayanti. Shahab has a younger brother named Raffi Shahab.

Shahab was born under the name of Muhammad Arfiza Shahab. At first he was called Umay is when he was still in the womb of his mother, at that time his mother often read a book that tells about the caliph of Islam, Umar bin Khattab. His mother then planned to give Umar's name to him, but since there were too many people named Umar, she then decided to change Umar's pronunciation to Umay. This innovation was finally approved by her husband, Said Hanafi Shahab. Although in the end Umay name does not become its official name, but the name was then he used as a nickname and his famous name since childhood.

Discography

Album

Singles

Filmography

Film

Soap opera

Webseries

Commercials

 KFC
 Mie Sedaap
 Kia Motors
 Mountea
 Indomie
 Dancow
 Biolysin Kids
 Mentos
 Yupi candy
 Curcuma Plus
 Masako
 Marimas
 and others

Works

Book
 KKPK Star: Umay Jagoan Cilik (2013), published by DAR! Mizan

Others

Awards and nominations

References

Footnotes

Bibliography

External links
 
 

2001 births
Living people
Indonesian people of Yemeni descent
Indonesian male actors
People from Jakarta